Geddic acid, or tetratriacontanoic acid, is a 34-carbon-long carboxylic acid and saturated fatty acid. It occurs in cotton, carnauba, candelilla wax, and in ghedda wax (wild beeswax), from which its common name is derived.

See also
 List of carboxylic acids
 List of saturated fatty acids
 Very long chain fatty acid

References

Alkanoic acids
Fatty acids